Loren Fletcher (April 10, 1833 – April 15, 1919) was a U.S. Representative from Minnesota.

Biography
He was born in Mount Vernon, Kennebec County, Maine and attended the public schools and Maine Wesleyan Seminary, Kents Hill, Maine. Fletcher moved to Bangor in 1853, where he was a stonecutter, clerk in a store, and an employee of a lumber company.

In 1856, he moved to Minneapolis, Minnesota, and engaged in manufacturing and mercantile pursuits, largely in the manufacture of lumber and flour.  He became a member of the board of directors of the First National Bank upon its establishment in 1864.

Fletcher was elected a member of the Minnesota House of Representatives 1872 – 1886, and served as speaker from 1880 to 1885.  Beginning with the 1892 election, he was elected as a Republican to the 53rd, 54th, 55th, 56th, and 57th congresses (March 4, 1893 – March 3, 1903).  Fletcher served as chairman of the Committee on Expenditures on Public Buildings (57th congress.  He was defeated in the 1902 election to the 58th congress, but was elected to the 59th congress, (March 4, 1905 – March 3, 1907).  He declined to be a candidate for reelection and retired from active business.

Fletcher died in Atlanta, Georgia, April 15, 1919, aged 86; he is interred in Lakewood Cemetery, Minneapolis, Minnesota.

Fletcher was married to Amerette J. Thomas from 1855 until she died in 1892.  The couple had one child, a daughter.

References

Minnesota Legislators Past and Present

Sources
Loren Fletcher Memorial. Minnesota Journal of the House, April 22, 1919, p. 1857.
Shutter, Marion Daniel. "Loren Fletcher." Progressive Men of Minnesota, Minneapolis: The Minneapolis Journal, 1897, p. 38-39.
"Fletcher, L." The Fifteenth Legislature of Minnesota. St. Paul: Press Printing Company, 1873, p. 27. 
"Hon. L. Fletcher." Memoirs of the State Officers; and of the Nineteenth Legislature of Minnesota, by C.L. Hall. Minneapolis: Johnson & Smith, p. 36.
 

Republican Party members of the Minnesota House of Representatives
Speakers of the Minnesota House of Representatives
People from Mount Vernon, Maine
Politicians from Bangor, Maine
1833 births
1919 deaths
Republican Party members of the United States House of Representatives from Minnesota
19th-century American politicians